Tyler Cade Ivey (born May 12, 1996) is an American professional baseball pitcher in the Houston Astros organization. He played college baseball for Texas A&M University, and was drafted out of Grayson College.

Amateur  career
Ivey attended Rockwall-Heath High School in Heath, Texas. As a freshman, he was on the 2012 4-A State Champion Rockwall-Heath baseball team that also included future major league pitcher Jake Thompson. Ivey was undrafted out of high school in 2015 and enrolled at Texas A&M University to play college baseball for the Aggies. He posted a 2–3 record with a 3.56 ERA in 43 innings over 11 games during the 2016 season. During that season, he was involved in an incident that almost caused a post-game brawl vs. the University of Texas, when he taunted the UT dugout with a horns down gesture. Ivey transferred to Grayson College in Denison, Texas for his sophomore season of 2017. With Grayson, Ivey posted a 9–0 record with a 2.08 ERA in 78 innings over 12 games. Ivey was drafted by the Houston Astros in the 3rd round, with the 91st overall selection, of the 2017 MLB draft and signed with them for a $450,000 signing bonus.

Professional career
Ivey split the 2017 season between the Gulf Coast League Astros and the Tri City ValleyCats of the Class A Short Season New York–Penn League, posting a combined 0–3 record with a 5.63 ERA in 38 innings. He split the 2018 season between the Quad Cities River Bandits of the Class A Midwest League and the Buies Creek Astros of the Class A-Advanced Carolina League, posting a combined 4–6 record with a 2.97 ERA and 135 strikeouts over 112 innings. He split the 2019 season between the GCL Astros, Fayetteville Woodpeckers, and Corpus Christi Hooks of the Class AA Texas League, going a combined 4–0 with a 1.38 ERA and 68 strikeouts over 52 innings.

Ivey did not play a minor league game in 2020 due to the cancellation of the minor league season caused by the COVID-19 pandemic. The Astros added Ivey to their 40-man roster after the 2020 season. On May 21, 2021, Ivey was promoted to the major leagues for the first time. He made his debut that day as the starting pitcher against the Texas Rangers, drawing a no-decision while allowing 4 runs in 4.2 innings of work.

On June 12, Ivey revealed that he had been pitching through elbow pain since suffering a grade one UCL strain in 2019 and that he would not pitch again in 2021. He stated “apparently I have the nerve endings of a 75-year old man in my elbow. That probably explains a lot”. He was designated for assignment on April 7, 2022. On April 11, Ivey was sent outright to the Triple-A Sugar Land Space Cowboys.

References

External links

Texas A&M Aggies bio

1996 births
Living people
People from Rowlett, Texas
Baseball players from Texas
Major League Baseball pitchers
Houston Astros players
Texas A&M Aggies baseball players
Grayson Vikings baseball players
Gulf Coast Astros players
Tri-City ValleyCats players
Quad Cities River Bandits players
Buies Creek Astros players
Fayetteville Woodpeckers players
Corpus Christi Hooks players
Sugar Land Skeeters players
Sugar Land Space Cowboys players
Florida Complex League Astros players